Rock Scorpion Books was an independent publishing forum run from the United Kingdom. It was formed in 2006 and specialised in publishing fiction and non-fiction which raised awareness about the British overseas territory of Gibraltar. Rock Scorpion books ceased to exist in 2013. Several of their former titles are currently published by Createspace International.

Publications
Titles included  Rock Black: Ten Gibraltarian Stories  and 'The Pearls of Morocco: Bresciano in Africa''.

Gibraltarian literature